Salvatore Lupo (born 7 July 1951) is an Italian historian and author from Siena, specializing in the Sicilian Mafia.

Lupo is a professor of contemporary history at the University of Palermo, previously professor of contemporary history at the University of Catania. He is the president of the Southern Institute of History and Social Sciences of Catania and deputy director of the quarterly magazine of the institute, Meridiana, of which he was one of the founders. He is a member of the editorial board of "Storica".

He is one of the most highly-rated mafia scholars in the Italian context, author of numerous publications on the crime phenomenon and contemporary history; he authored Quando la Mafia trovò l'America, which, in 2009, won the Brancati Prize.

On 1 December 2015, in Rome, he was invited to the hearing of the "Parliamentary Commission of Inquiry into the Mafia phenomenon and other criminal associations, including foreign ones", as part of the investigation into the relationship between the Mafia and politics in Sicily.

Works 
 Blocco agrario e crisi in Sicilia tra le due guerre, Napoli, Guida, 1981. .
 Agricoltura ricca nel sottosviluppo. Storia e mito della Sicilia agrumaria. (1860-1950), Catania, s. n., 1984.
 La dimora di Demetra. Storia, tecnica e mito dell'agricoltura siciliana, et Al., Palermo, Gelka, 1989. .
 Il giardino degli aranci. Il mondo degli agrumi nella storia del Mezzogiorno, Venezia, Marsilio, 1990. .
 I proprietari terrieri nel Mezzogiorno, in Storia dell'agricoltura italiana in età contemporanea, II, Uomini e classi, Venezia, Marsilio, 1990. .
 Storia della mafia. Dalle origini ai nostri giorni, Roma, Donzelli, 1993. ; 1996. ; 2004. .
 Andreotti, la mafia, la storia d'Italia, Roma, Donzelli, 1996. .
 Mafia, politica, storia d'Italia: a proposito del processo Andreotti, in Antimafia, Roma, Donzelli, 1996. .
 Il fascismo. La politica in un regime totalitario, Roma, Donzelli, 2000. .
 Antifascismo, anticomunismo e anti-antifascismo nell'Italia repubblicana, in AA.VV., Antifascismo e identità europea, Roma, Carocci, 2004. .
 Partito e antipartito. Una storia politica della prima Repubblica, 1946-78, Roma, Donzelli, 2004. .
 Che cos'è la mafia. Sciascia e Andreotti, l'antimafia e la politica, Roma, Donzelli, 2007. .
 From Palermo to America. L'iconografia commerciale dei limoni di Sicilia, with Antonino Buttitta and Sergio Troisi, Palermo, Sellerio, 2007. .
 Quando la mafia trovò l'America. Storia di un intreccio intercontinentale, 1888-2008, Torino, Einaudi, 2008. .
 Potere criminale. Intervista sulla storia della mafia, intervista a cura di Gaetano Savatteri, Roma-Bari, Laterza, 2010. .
 Il passato del nostro presente. Il lungo Ottocento 1776-1913, Roma-Bari, Laterza, 2010. .
 Il tenebroso sodalizio. Il primo rapporto di polizia sulla mafia siciliana, postfazione di John Dickie, Roma, XL, 2011. .
 L'unificazione italiana. Mezzogiorno, Rivoluzione, Guerra civile, Roma, Donzelli, 2011. .
 Antipartiti. Il mito della nuova politica nella storia della Repubblica (prima, seconda e terza), Roma, Donzelli, 2013. 
 Il fascismo: la politica in un regime totalitario, Milano, Feltrinelli, 2013. 
 La mafia non ha vinto. Il labirinto della trattativa, with Giovanni Fiandaca, Roma-Bari, Laterza, 2014. 
 La questione: come liberare la storia del Mezzogiorno dagli stereotipi, Roma, Donzelli, 2015. 
La mafia. Centosessant'anni di Storia. Tra Sicilia e America, Roma, Donzelli, 2018.

References

1951 births
Living people
Italian male non-fiction writers
Non-fiction writers about organized crime in Italy
People from Siena